Chad Davis (born May 22, 1973) is a former American football quarterback who played two seasons with the Memphis Pharaohs/Portland Forest Dragons of the Arena Football League. He played college football at Washington State University.

References

External links
Just Sports Stats
College stats

Living people
1973 births
American football quarterbacks
Washington State Cougars football players
Place of birth missing (living people)
Memphis Pharaohs players
Portland Forest Dragons players